Honkanen is a Finnish surname. Notable people with the surname include:

Veikko Honkanen (1908–1999), Finnish politician
Tauno Honkanen (born 1927), Finnish skier
Raimo Honkanen (1938–2020), Finnish cyclist
Jakke Honkanen (born 1960), Finnish rally driver
Jani Honkanen (born 1979), Finnish ice hockey player
Jenni Honkanen (born 1980), Finnish sprint canoeist
Manu Honkanen (born 1996), Finnish ice hockey player

References

Finnish-language surnames